Lexi, Lexy, Lexey, Lexee, or Lexie is a nickname or normal name of given names starting with "Alex" or another variation of the name "Lex" (such as Alexis, Alexandra, Alexandria, Alexander, Alexandre, Alexa, Alexia, Alexi,  Lexus, Lexine etc.).
Both forms usually, but not exclusively, refer to a female name.

People
Lexi Ainsworth, American actress, best known for portraying Kristina Davis on General Hospital
Lexi Alexander, German filmmaker and martial artist
Lexi Allen, also known by her mononym Lexi, American singer, actress and television personality
Lexi Bender, American ice hockey player
Lexi Boling, American fashion model
Lexie Brown, American basketball player
Lexie Contursi, American actress
Lexi Davis, American softball player
Lexie Dean Robertson, American poet
Lexi duPont, American freestyle skier
Lexie Elkins, American softball player
Lexie Feeney, Australian archer
Lexi Fernandez, Filipino actress, host, singer and dancer
Lexie Fyfe, American professional wrestler
Lexi Gonzales, Filipino actress, host, singer and dancer
Lexi Lane, American professional wrestler
Lexie Madden, American beauty pageant titleholder
Lexi Peters, American ice hockey player
Lexie Priessman, American artistic gymnast
Lexi Randall, Former child actor
Lexi Thompson, American golfer
Lexi VonderLieth, American surfer
Lexi Weeks, American pole vaulter
Lexi Wilson, Bahamian model

Fictional characters
Lexi Bunny, an anthropomorphic rabbit from Loonatics Unleashed
Lexie Carver, a character in the soap opera Days of Our Lives
Lexie Grey, a character from the Grey's Anatomy TV series
Lexi Howard, a main character from the Euphoria TV series
Lexi Kubota, a character from the Nickelodeon/Netflix series Glitch Techs
Lexie MacDonald, a character from the BBC series Monarch of the Glen
Lexi Pearce, a character in the soap opera EastEnders
Lexi King, a fictional character from the soap opera Emmerdale
Lexi Sterling, a character from the soap opera Melrose Place

See also
 
 

English feminine given names
English-language feminine given names